The 15th Producers Guild of America Awards (also known as 2004 Producers Guild Awards), honoring the best film and television producers of 2003, were held at The Century Plaza Hotel in Los Angeles, California on January 17, 2004. The ceremony was hosted by John Larroquette. The nominees were announced on January 5, 2004.

Winners and nominees

Film
{| class=wikitable style="width="100%"
|-
! colspan="2" style="background:#abcdef;"| Darryl F. Zanuck Award for Outstanding Producer of Theatrical Motion Pictures
|-
| colspan="2" style="vertical-align:top;"|
 The Lord of the Rings: The Return of the King – Barrie M. Osborne, Peter Jackson, and Fran Walsh Cold Mountain
 The Last Samurai
 Master and Commander: The Far Side of the World
 Mystic River
 Seabiscuit
|}

Television

David O. Selznick Achievement Award in Theatrical Motion PicturesDino De LaurentiisDavid Susskind Achievement Award in TelevisionLorne MichaelsMilestone AwardWarren BeattyStanley Kramer AwardJim Sheridan and Arthur Lappin for In America

Vanguard Award
James Cameron

Visionary Award
Mike Nichols and Cary Brokaw for Angels in America

References

 2003
2003 film awards
2003 television awards
Producers Guild Awards
2003 guild awards